Jack Marshall (1912–1988) was Prime Minister of New Zealand.

Jack Marshall may also refer to:

Sports
Jack Marshall (ice hockey) (1877–1965), Canadian ice hockey player
Jack Marshall (pitcher) (1893–?), Negro leagues baseball pitcher
Jack Marshall (second baseman) (1908–1990), American Negro league baseball player
Jack Marshall (soccer) (1892–1964), American soccer player
Jack Marshall (cricketer) (1916–2000), English cricketer
Jack Marshall (footballer, born 1917) (1917–1998), English football manager
Jack Marshall (footballer, born 1895) (1895–1968), English footballer
Jack Marshall (rugby union) (1926–2013), represented Australia

Other people
Jack Marshall (Canadian politician) (1919–2004)
Jack Marshall (composer) (1921–1973), American guitarist, conductor, and composer
Jack Marshall (author) (born 1936), American poet and author

Fictional
Jack Marshall, fictional protagonist of The Hacker Files, a DC Comics mini-series

See also
John Marshall (disambiguation)